Bayfest was a 3-day music festival in Corpus Christi, Texas. It had its 35th consecutive running year in 2010, the finale.

History
In 1976 the Arts Council of Corpus Christi and the Junior League of Corpus Christi co-sponsored the first Bayfest. The festival was held annually & concluded its 35th event in 2010. Bayfest had celebrated the unique cultural and ethnic diversity of our region by composing a colorful explosion of music, art, entertainment and fun. 

80% of funds that were raised were returned to these groups to continue and expand their activities with the remaining 20% to help stage the festival for the following year.

Bayfest works with over 5,000 community volunteers who give their time and efforts to assure its success each year and Bayfest, Inc. was a non-profit organisation.

With low revenue turnout in 2010, Bayfest ended its run.

External links
City of Corpus Christi Recreation

Music festivals in Texas
Culture of Corpus Christi, Texas
Tourist attractions in Corpus Christi, Texas